The 1940 Wichita Shockers football team was an American football team that represented Wichita University (now known as Wichita State University) as an independent during the 1940 college football season. In their 11th season under head coach Al Gebert, the Shockers compiled a 6–4 record and outscored opponents by a total of 102 to 72.

Schedule

References

Wichita
Wichita State Shockers football seasons
Wichita Shockers football